Dávid Losonczi is a Hungarian wrestler.

Losonczi competed in the 2021 World Wrestling Championships for athletes under 23 years of age. He won the silver medal in the men's Greco-Roman 87 kg event after losing to Aleksandr Komarov in the finals.

He represented Hungary at the 2022 World Wrestling Championships, again competing in the 87 kg class. He reached the semi final stage, in which he lost to Zurab Datunashvili, and subsequently won the bronze match against Alex Bjurberg Kessidis.

References

External links 

Living people
Place of birth missing (living people)
Year of birth missing (living people)
Hungarian male sport wrestlers
World Wrestling Championships medalists
21st-century Hungarian people